The "nuclear umbrella" is a guarantee by a nuclear weapons state to defend a non-nuclear allied state. The context is usually the security alliances of the United States with Japan, South Korea, and the North Atlantic Treaty Organization (much of Europe, Turkey, Canada). Those alliances were formed because of the Cold War and the Soviet Union. For some countries, it was an alternative to acquiring nuclear weapons themselves; other alternatives include regional nuclear-weapon-free zones or nuclear sharing.

NATO
NATO was formed early in the Cold War and, from the beginning, assumed American nuclear power as a major component of defense of Western Europe from possible Soviet invasion. Most non-Communist European states joined the alliance, although some (Ireland, Switzerland, Austria, Sweden, Finland) instead maintained an official policy of neutrality. Sweden and Switzerland considered developing their own nuclear weapons but abandoned the idea.

NATO involved others of the five official nuclear weapons states. The United Kingdom and Canada participated in the initial American development of the atomic bomb (Manhattan Project) during World War II, but were afterwards excluded from nuclear weapons secrets by act of the US Congress. Britain launched an independent nuclear weapons program; after Britain successfully developed thermonuclear weapons, the US and UK signed the 1958 US–UK Mutual Defence Agreement sharing American weapons designs, eliminating the need for independent development. Canada has not officially maintained and possessed weapons of mass destruction since 1984 (Canada and weapons of mass destruction)

France developed a nuclear force de frappe and left the NATO command structure while continuing to be allied with the other Western countries.  NATO nuclear sharing was conceived to prevent further independent proliferation among the western allies.  France later rejoined the NATO joint military command on April 4, 2009.

After the end of the Cold War, many Central and Eastern European countries joined NATO.

United States 
The United States has promised its role as a "nuclear umbrella" for numerous non-nuclear allied states, even as early as the Cold War. The US now has security alliances of this nature with around 30 countries, many within NATO itself. The country also has notable arrangements of this type with South Korea and Australia. The US understood the power of deterrence with nuclear weapons early on, beginning with the concept of massive retaliation during the Eisenhower administration. As the USSR and other countries became nuclear powers as well, however, the risk of any nuclear exchange became more clear. This, in part, motivated the US to adopt the new strategy of deterrence, in which they would have more control over the situation, while still maintaining the ability to intervene in conflicts, a nuclear umbrella. The US provides protection and deterrence for various countries under its umbrella, and in turn, the countries do not pursue nuclear weapons programs themselves. More recently, however, concerns have been raised about the diminishing power of such a threat, due to the rapid increase of nuclear weapons of mass destruction across the globe. Russia in particular has caused concern, having focused their military doctrine on nuclear weapons, as well as continued in the development of their weapons programs. Currently, the United States holds only some "nonstrategic" military weapons in Europe, and these nonstrategic weapons aid in reassuring countries under the umbrella, and emphasizing their role as a deterrent. The strategy of deterrence remains unequivocally important for the country, but many argue that the US will face various new challenges when it comes to the rise of other nuclear powers and weapons of mass destruction.

ANZUS
ANZUS is a security treaty between Australia, New Zealand, and the United States that was signed on September 1, 1951. This treaty was meant to assure peace in the South Pacific region. It was primarily a tactic against communist spread assuring Australia and New Zealand they would not be caught under communist grip. New Zealand, Australia, and the United States agreed to maintain and develop military resources to prevent an attack from communist countries in the Pacific. As late as 1970, Australia considered embarking on nuclear weapons development but finally agreed to sign the Nuclear Non-Proliferation Treaty. Since then Australia has been a proponent of nuclear disarmament. New Zealand declared themselves as a nuclear free zone in 1984 which refused to allow US nuclear powered ships to dock in New Zealand. Thus, in 1986 the United States suspended its treaty with New Zealand, but kept it with Australia. Today, leaders in the Australian government publicly acknowledge the country's reliance on the US nuclear umbrella. Australia no longer faces immediate nuclear threats, but they do still rely on the US for protection in any future instances, making them one of 31 countries under the US nuclear umbrella.

Japan
The Japanese nuclear weapon program was conducted during World War II. Like the German nuclear weapons program, it suffered from an array of problems, and was ultimately unable to progress beyond the laboratory stage.  Following the atomic bombings of Hiroshima and Nagasaki, World War II and the deconstruction of the imperial military, Japan came under the US "nuclear umbrella" on the condition that it will not produce nuclear weapons.  This was formalized in the Security Treaty Between the United States and Japan, which preceded the current security alliance, the Treaty of Mutual Cooperation and Security between the United States and Japan.

Japan and the United States also have a major missile defense accord to mitigate the North Korean nuclear threat, among others and have deployed the Aegis Ballistic Missile Defense System jointly.

South Korea 
Following the Korean War, South Korea was welcomed under the US "nuclear umbrella" after signing the ROK-US mutual security treaty on October 1, 1953. This was characteristic of US defense and foreign policy at the time, which championed extended deterrence in an effort to prevent any nuclear conflict. The agreement also aligned with the US nonproliferation objectives, by eliminating the need for South Korea to develop its own nuclear weapons program. In the ROK-US mutual security treaty, the US agreed to deter attacks against South Korea and defend them in the case of attacks, and to deploy troops at the Korean Demilitarized Zone. The US also positioned tactical nuclear weapons on the Korean Peninsula, but these weapons were retracted by President Bush on September, 1991. The US nuclear umbrella over South Korea has persisted for over 60 years. Most agree on the necessity and significance of the US nuclear umbrella and the ROK-US treaty for South Korea, and expect it to hold its place.

Warsaw Pact (former)
Like NATO, the members of the Warsaw Pact were protected by nuclear weapons of the Soviet Union with the weapons being deployed either in Soviet territory or closer to NATO in territory of the other member states, particularly Poland (see Poland and weapons of mass destruction). Unlike NATO however there was no nuclear sharing and all weapons remained completely under Soviet control. At least one member of the Warsaw Pact, Romania, did consider developing its own arsenal but later abandoned it (see Romania and weapons of mass destruction). Most Eastern European Communist states were part of the Warsaw Pact with the exception of Yugoslavia which became neutral especially after the Tito–Stalin Split, and Albania later left the alliance after the Soviet–Albanian split and aligned itself with the People's Republic of China which had also cut ties with the Soviets in the Sino-Soviet split.

Soviet Allies outside of the Warsaw Pact
It is unclear if and to what extent the Soviet Union's nuclear umbrella covered other allied communist and non communist states outside of the Warsaw Pact at one time or another besides China prior to the Sino-Soviet Split (see China and weapons of mass destruction) and Cuba (see the Cuban Missile Crisis).

Russian nuclear umbrella
The term is far less used for Russian nuclear guarantees, but is seen occasionally.

 Unspecified countries
 Kazakhstan
 Kyrgyzstan
 Commonwealth of Independent States

China nuclear umbrella

In a unilateral governmental statement in 1994, China provided Ukraine with nuclear security guarantee, where China states its inclination to peaceful settlement of differences and disputes by way of fair consultations. In December 2013, Ukrainian President Viktor Yanukovych and Chinese Communist Party leader Xi Jinping signed a bilateral treaty and published a joint statement, where China reaffirmed that it will provide Ukraine with nuclear security guarantees upon nuclear invasion or threats of invasion. People's Daily, the official newspaper of the Central Committee of the Chinese Communist Party, used the headline "China offers Ukraine nuclear umbrella protection", which has been censored since the Russian invasion of Ukraine. When asked about the 2013 pact during a news conference on March 3 2022, Wang Wenbin, a spokesperson for China's Foreign Ministry,  sidestepped the question by referring to a United Nations resolution on the security of nonnuclear states like Ukraine. “The security assurances have clear limitations on the content and are triggered under specific conditions,” Mr. Wang said.

Missile defense
Missile defense would provide an "umbrella" of another kind against nuclear attack. This is not the conventional usage of "nuclear umbrella", but a rhetorical device promoting active defense over the nuclear deterrence the conventional "nuclear umbrella" depends upon. NATO had an expansive strategy with respect to missile defense. In 1999, it was concluded that they would need some form of defense against nuclear, biological, or chemical threats. One form of strategy was declared at the 2002 Prague Summit, the NATO Active Layered Ballistic Missile Defense (ALTBMD). This was an extension to the deployed forces program in 2005, namely, guaranteeing their safety. One of the leading motivations for the strategic concept is that NATO centered on the proliferation of nuclear weapons and alternatives for weapons of mass destruction as being an incalculable threat to global life and prosperity. More recent, on March 6, 2013, the first European theater missile interceptor system proved successful to work in conjunction with NATO's Interim Ballistic Missile Defense (BMD) command and control system, such that it successfully engaged and destroyed a theater ballistic missile target set at the French Firing Range in Biscarrosse. Countries involved with NATO host various components of the NATO missile defense command and control systems. The United States contribution to the NATO BMD is through its European Phased Adaptive Approach (EPAA). Turkey hosts the United States BMD radar in Kürecik. Romania hosts a United States Aegis Ashore Site at Deveselu Military Base. Germany hosts the command center Ramstein Air Base. In addition to the EPAA, Spain holds four multi-mission BMD-capable Aegis Ships at the Rota Naval Base. With respect to all these constituents, they are in fact all voluntarily hosted. Outside of this there is additional composition of force protection and BMD capable-assets, that in the event of needed support could be engaged. With the stakes of nuclear war implausibly comprehensive advocacy groups such as the Missile Defense Advocacy Alliance (MDAA) were formed as a public initiative to cultivate an environment for the critical importance of supporting the funding and development of missile defense systems. The MDAA is a non-profit organization that has set out a mission to educate the general public on advocacy for the testing, continued development, and deployment of missile defense systems and the urgent consequences of handicapping a missile defense system.

See also
Nixon Doctrine

References

Cold War
Cold War treaties
Foreign relations of Australia
Foreign relations of Japan
Foreign relations of the Soviet Union
Foreign relations of South Korea
Foreign relations of the United States
Politics of NATO
Nuclear weapons policy
International relations terminology
International security
20th-century military alliances
21st-century military alliances